Pandemia is a 2006 post-apocalyptic teen novel written by American author Johnathan Rand (a pseudonym of Christopher Knight). The novel depicts a scenario in which bird flu mutates and becomes a global epidemic because of modern transportation methods, eventually causing a universal state of emergency.

Plot
The disease that causes a world-wide catastrophe in the novel is H5N1, a strain of bird flu that was in the news at the time of publication. Its mutation and rapid spread eventually causes the collapse of society and many economies across the world.

The book's central plot features a group of teens in Saline, Michigan that must try and escape the city and head to the countryside where they can hopefully stay alive long enough in their uncle's cabin to be rescued. But in doing so, the teens must use whatever weapons they can find to defend themselves against looters, insane killers, and potentially dangerous sources of infection. In a world gone mad, the group must find the necessities, food, water and shelter, to survive.

External links
 Johnathan Rand's official website 
 Pandemia, Barnes & Noble
 Pandemia, Shelfari

References

2006 American novels
American young adult novels
Apocalyptic novels
American post-apocalyptic novels
Works about societal collapse